Malcolm Forsyth,  (December 8, 1936 – July 5, 2011) was a South African and Canadian trombonist and composer. His daughter is former National Arts Centre Orchestra principal cellist Amanda Forsyth.

Life and career

Forsyth was born in Pietermaritzburg, and educated at Maritzburg College South Africa.  He studied trombone, conducting, and composition at the University of Cape Town from which he received a Bachelor of Music in 1963.

He played trombone with the Cape Town Symphony Orchestra while studying and receiving his Master of Music in 1966 and Doctorate of Music in 1969. In 1968, he emigrated to Canada and joined the Edmonton Symphony Orchestra with which he played bass trombone for 11 years. He was a Professor of Music at the University of Alberta for 34 years. He was appointed Composer-In-Residence in 1996 and remained so until the time of his retirement in 2002.

In 1970, he wrote Sketches from Natal for the Canadian Broadcasting Corporation. Some of his other works include Concerto for Piano and Orchestra (1979), Sagittarius (1975), Quinquefid (1976), African Ode (Symphony No. 3) (1981), and Atayoskewin (Suite for Orchestra) (1984), which won the Juno Award for Classical Composition of the Year in 1987.

Death
Forsyth died on July 5, 2011, aged 74, from pancreatic cancer.

Honours
In 1989, he was named Canadian Composer of the Year.

In 2003, he was made a Member of the Order of Canada.

Sources
The Canadian Encyclopedia, "Forsyth, Malcolm" (accessed 13 January 2010)  
Kennedy, Michael and Bourne, Joyce (eds), "Forsyth, Malcolm", The Concise Oxford Dictionary of Music, Oxford University Press, 2007 (accessed via Answers.com 13 January 2010) 
Kennedy, Michael (2006), The Oxford Dictionary of Music, 985 pages,  
Primos, Kathy. 1994. "A Life Experience: The Orchestral Works of Malcolm Forsyth." SoundNotes. SN6:12-21.

External links
 https://web.archive.org/web/20111229101724/http://www.musiccentre.ca/mus-pla.cfm?audiofile=Podcast_12-CC.mp3&buyitem=1
 http://www.legacy.com/obituaries/edmontonjournal/obituary.aspx?page=notice&pid=152425344#fbLoggedOut

(An hour-long radio interview with Forsyth in 2008)

1936 births
2011 deaths
20th-century classical composers
21st-century classical composers
Canadian classical composers
Canadian male classical composers
Deaths from cancer in Alberta
Deaths from pancreatic cancer
Juno Award for Classical Composition of the Year winners
Members of the Order of Canada
South African emigrants to Canada
South African College of Music alumni
Alumni of Maritzburg College
20th-century Canadian composers
20th-century Canadian male musicians
21st-century Canadian male musicians